Yiddishkeit literally means "Jewishness", i.e. "a Jewish way of life". It can refer to Judaism or forms of Orthodox Judaism when used by religious or Orthodox Jews. In a more general sense, it has come to mean the "Jewishness" or "Jewish essence" of Ashkenazi Jews in general and the traditional Yiddish-speaking Jews of Eastern and Central Europe in particular. 

According to The JC, "'Yiddishkeit' evokes the teeming vitality of the shtetl, the singsong of Talmud study emanating from the cheder and the ecstatic spirituality of Chasidim."  Moreso than the word "Judaism," the word 'Yiddishkeit' evokes the Eastern European world and has an authentic ring to it.  "Judaism suggests an ideology, a set of definite beliefs like socialism, conservatism or atheism. The suffix -keit in German, on the other hand, means -ness in English, which connotes a way of being. … Not merely a creed but an organic and all-encompassing, pulsing, breathing way of life" 

From a more secular perspective, it is associated with the popular culture or folk practices of Yiddish-speaking Jews, such as popular religious traditions, Eastern European Jewish cuisine, Yiddish humor, shtetl life, and klezmer music, among other things. 

Before the Haskalah and the Jewish emancipation in Europe, central to Yiddishkeit were Torah study and Talmudical studies for men, and a family and communal life governed by the observance of halakha (Jewish religious laws) for men and women. Among Haredi Jews of Eastern European descent, who compose the majority of Jews who still speak Yiddish in their everyday lives, the word has retained this meaning.

But with secularization, Yiddishkeit has come to encompass not just traditional Jewish religious practice, but a broad range of movements, ideologies, practices, and traditions in which Ashkenazi Jews have participated and retained their sense of "Jewishness". (See: Jewish secularism & Jewish atheism.) Yiddishkeit has been identified in manners of speech, in styles of humor, in patterns of association, in culture and education. Another quality often associated with Yiddishkeit is an emotional attachment and identification with the Jewish people.

See also
Jewish culture
The Joys of Yiddish
Who is a Jew?
Yiddish literature
Yiddish theatre
Olga Avigail Mieleszczuk

References

External links
California Institute for Yiddish Culture and Language
Ashkenazi Jews topics
Jewish culture
Yiddish words and phrases